Sussex Land District is a land district (cadastral division) of Western Australia, located within the South-West Land Division on the state's west coast. It covers the south-western corner of the state and includes the townsites of Busselton, Margaret River and Augusta as well as Cape Naturaliste and Cape Leeuwin.

History
The system of land districts came together in an ad-hoc fashion, and the Sussex district started to be subdivided in 1840 well before any thought was given to formally defining its boundaries. The definition later used by the Lands and Surveys department came from an 1862 gazettal which read as follows:

Towns and areas

Towns
The Sussex district contains the following current or former townsites:

Agricultural areas
Under the Land Act 1898, the Agricultural Lands Purchase Act 1896, and preceding regulations, it was open to the Governor to declare agricultural areas on crown land or repurchased estates on private land, to which special provisions applied for both alienation and improvement. Many of these estates came into being shortly after World War I for the purposes of soldier resettlement.

References

Land districts of Western Australia
1862 establishments in Australia